K-value or k value may refer to:

 Thermal conductivity
 The force constant of a spring, see Hooke's law
 Vapor–liquid equilibrium, the ratio of vapor concentration to liquid concentration at equilibrium
 The relative permittivity, κ
 a statistical value used in the Elo rating system
 analysis provides a methodology for studying different factors that affect the size of a biological population.
 K value (viscosity), is an empirical parameter closely related to intrinsic viscosity, often defined in slightly different ways in different industries to express viscosity based estimate of statistical molecular mass of polymeric material used particularly for PVC. The most commonly used K value in Europe is the Fikentscher K value (referenced in DIN EN ISO 1628-1) obtained by dilute solution viscometry and solving Fikentscher equation.
 KIc or Linear-Elastic Plane-Strain Fracture Toughness of Metals
 rate of change of curvature, used to assess and design vertical alignment of road and rail crests and dips
 Freshness Quality Index for assessing fish quality. It represents the ratio between the sum of inosine and hypoxanthine to the sum of all other products of ATP degradation.

See also 
 K-factor (disambiguation)